Gravity is an underground independent record label from San Diego. It was formed in 1991 by Matt Anderson, a member of the influential underground band Heroin.  It has been central in developing and promoting the "San Diego sound" – an idiosyncratic form of post-hardcore with loose, chaotic musicianship and vocals, initiated by Heroin, Antioch Arrow, and Clikatat Ikatowi, as well as Mohinder from the Bay Area and Angel Hair from Colorado. The sound is associated with the first wave of screamo, and the label played an important role in the development of post-hardcore in the 1990s. Gravity has also branched out into other forms of experimental or independent music, releasing seminal early works by Unwound, Black Dice, The Rapture, and a full-length from Man Is The Bastard.

Label roster

 Angel Hair
 Antioch Arrow
 Bastard Noise
 Black Dice
 The Black Heart Procession
 Born Against
 Clikatat Ikatowi
 The Convocation
 Crime Desire
 Crom-Tech
 A Day Called Zero
 Earthless
 Evergreen
 Fisticuffs Bluff
 The Fucking Angels
 Get Hustle
 Heroin
 Huggy Bear
 John Henry West
 Lava
 Les Aus
 Man Is the Bastard
 Men's Recovery Project
 Mohinder
 Monorchid
 Physics
 Prizehog
 The Rapture
 Sea of Tombs
 Second Story Window
 The Spacewürm
 Spacehorse
 Stacatto Reads
 Three Mile Pilot
 Tristeza
 Universal Order of Armageddon
 Unwound
 The V.S.S.
 Vicious Ginks
 Young Ginns

Discography
This list is organized by catalog number. Also note that two releases that have the catalog number 2 and, there is no release in the Gravity Records catalog to have the catalog number 50.

See also
 List of record labels

References

External links
 Gravity Records website
 Gravity Records Discogs page
 Matt Anderson/Gravity records Interview

American independent record labels
Post-hardcore record labels
Record labels established in 1991
Experimental music record labels
Alternative rock record labels
Indie rock record labels
1991 establishments in California